is a railway station in the city of Iwata, Shizuoka Prefecture, Japan, operated by Central Japan Railway Company (JR Tōkai).

Lines
Toyodachō Station is served by the Tōkaidō Main Line, and is located 248.8 kilometers from the starting point of the line at Tokyo Station.

Station layout
The station has two opposing side platforms connected by the station building which is built above the platforms. The station building has automated ticket machines, TOICA automated turnstiles and a staffed ticket office.

Platforms

Adjacent stations

|-
!colspan=5|Central Japan Railway Company

History
Toyodachō Station is a relatively new station on the Tōkaidō Main Line, having been opened on December 14, 1991 in Toyoda town, Shizuoka, prior to its merger with nearby Iwata City in 2005.

Station numbering was introduced to the section of the Tōkaidō Line operated JR Central in March 2018; Toyodachō Station was assigned station number CA32.

Passenger statistics
In fiscal 2017, the station was used by an average of 2,829 passengers daily (boarding passengers only).

Surrounding area
former Toyoda town hall

See also
 List of Railway Stations in Japan

References

Yoshikawa, Fumio. Tokaido-sen 130-nen no ayumi. Grand-Prix Publishing (2002) .

External links

  

Railway stations in Japan opened in 1991
Railway stations in Shizuoka Prefecture
Tōkaidō Main Line
Stations of Central Japan Railway Company
Iwata, Shizuoka